Parliamentary elections were held in North Korea on 11 November 1977 to elect the 579 members of the sixth Supreme People's Assembly. In the first session of the parliament that was formed that year, the second seven-year economic development plan (1978–1984) was approved. Another topic on the agenda was "Let us Further Strengthen the People's Government", which was released on 15 December.

Results

References

External links
North Korean parliamentary election, 1977 at Inter-Parliamentary Union

Elections in North Korea
Parliamentary
North Korea
Supreme People's Assembly
North Korea
Election and referendum articles with incomplete results